Julius Stockfleth  (January 29, 1857 – 1935) was a German-born painter of landscapes and marine subjects. His images of the city of Galveston, Texas, constitute a valuable record of the town between 1885 and 1907, especially its devastation by the hurricane of 1900.

Biography
Julius Stockfleth was born in Wyk auf Föhr in Schleswig-Holstein, Germany. He was the son of  Louise (Hansen) Stockfleth and Friedrich August Stockfleth, a sailor and ship's carpenter. After an apprenticeship with a local painter, he emigrated to the United States in 1883, settling in Galveston in 1885.

During the two decades that Stockfleth lived in Galveston, he frequently painted the city's docks, its harbor, and its ships. He found a good market for this work among the ships' crews. The 1900 hurricane killed a dozen members of his extended family, and as a way to cope with the tragedy he undertook a series of paintings that documented the city during the hurricane and its subsequent rebuilding. His are the only known contemporary paintings of the Galveston hurricane. Altogether, Stockfleth left some 100 paintings of Texas subjects painted in a naïve realist style.

He returned to Germany in 1907, living in Wyk until his death and painting local scenes.

Some of his work is in the collection of the Rosenberg Library.

References

Further reading
Martens, Johannes, and Erik M, eds. Julius Stockfleth: Wyker Sketchbook. Boyens, Heide, 2005.
McGuire, James Patrick. Julius Stockfleth. San Antonio, TX: Trinity University Press, 1976.

1857 births
1935 deaths
19th-century German painters
19th-century German male artists
20th-century German painters
20th-century German male artists
Artists from Texas
German marine artists
German landscape painters
Galveston Hurricane of 1900